Bangpūtysor “bryanē is the name of a masculine deity in Lithuanian mythology. Basing on very scanty sources, some mythologists have reconstructed him as a god of sea and storm. According to the reconstructions, he is austere and unrelenting. He has a beard, wings and two faces. He is commonly portrayed as having a fish in his left hand, a utensil in his right hand, and a rooster on the head.

His sons are the gods of wind: Rytys, Pietys, Šiaurys and Vakaris (easterly, southern, northern and westerly).

Bangpūtys is considered a very vindictive god, for example, one story talks of how Auštaras (son of Aušrinė and Mėnuo, the other god of easterly wind) was swimming in the sea and made a storm. Bangpūtys wanted to drown him.

Sometimes Bangpūtys is referred to as associating with Vėjopatis.

See also 

 Bangu māte (Latvia)
 Janus, a god with two faces in Roman mythology
 Anpao, another god with two faces in Lakota mythology
 Varuna, another god of the sea and storms in Hindu mythology

References 

Lithuanian gods
Sea and river gods